Farrugia is a family name with a theoretical etymology based in both Latin fellus and Semitic faruj, first found in Malta, Calabria and Sicily. In the Maltese language the word farruġ refers to a cockerel (a young rooster). It has been exported by immigration to places including the United States, United Kingdom (specifically Wales and England), Australia, Canada, France and Russia. In some cases the family name is Jewish in origin.

Spelling variations of this family name include Farruggia, Farruġa, Ferrugia, Ferruggia and Farruj.

Origin 
Early in the Middle Ages, individuals with this family name (or some variant) moved to the island of Malta from neighbouring Sicily. Many settlers were recorded from the end of the 19th century in the great migration from Italy to the New World. Usually arriving at Ellis Island they settled in the eastern seaboard.

People named Farrugia include:
Aaron Farrugia (born 1980), politician
Amelia Farrugia (born 1970), Australian opera soprano of Maltese descent
Angelo Farrugia (born 1955), politician
Dominique Farrugia (born 1982), French actor, film director, screenwriter, producer and humorist
Francis Saviour Farrugia (18th century), philosopher
Johnston Farrugia (born 1980), rapper
Louis Farrugia (1857–1933, theologian
Mario Farrugia (born 1955), footballer
Ray Farrugia (born 1955), football coach
Sonia Farrugia (1976), footballer

References 

Surnames of Italian origin
Arabic-language surnames
Maltese-language surnames